The 1983–84 season was the 85th completed season of the English Football League.

Liverpool had a successful first season under the management of Joe Fagan as they wrapped up their third successive league title and the 15th in their history. They overcame strong competition from Southampton, Nottingham Forest and Manchester United to lift the championship trophy. Liverpool had an extremely strong season, as they also won the European Cup and the League Cup.

Southampton finished second in the league to record their highest-ever final position and achieve a UEFA Cup place, claiming six points from the last two games (both away) to climb up from fifth place.

The First Division relegation places were occupied by Birmingham City, Notts County and Wolverhampton Wanderers.

The £1 rescue deal of Chelsea by chairman Ken Bates paid off as they won the Second Division title and were promoted to the First Division along with Sheffield Wednesday and Newcastle United.

Cambridge United finished bottom of the Second Division and were relegated to the Third Division. They were joined by two clubs who had been enjoying better fortunes only a short time ago — Swansea City, who had finished sixth in the First Division just two years earlier, and Derby County, who had been league champions just nine years earlier. Derby's Peter Taylor retired as manager and his surprise successor was Arthur Cox, who had just taken Newcastle into the First Division.

Dave Bassett agreed to take charge of Crystal Palace at the end of the season, but changed his mind three days later — without signing the contract — and returned to Wimbledon. Palace installed former Manchester United winger Steve Coppell, 29, as their new manager.

Oxford United, Wimbledon and Sheffield United continued their rise through the league by gaining promotion to the Second Division.

Scunthorpe United, Southend United, Port Vale and Exeter City slipped out of the Third Division.

Narrowly avoiding the Third Division drop zone were Plymouth Argyle, who compensated for their league form by reaching the FA Cup semi finals for the first time in their history.

York City, Doncaster Rovers, Reading and Bristol City occupied the Fourth Division promotion places. York City became the first team in English league football to gain more than 100 points in a season, with 101. It was Bristol City's first successful season for a long time and a reversal of fortune after their recent fall from the First to Fourth Division in successive seasons.

The re-election system voted in favour of the bottom four clubs in the Fourth Division once again.

Final league tables and results 

The tables and results below are reproduced here in the exact form that they can be found at The Rec.Sport.Soccer Statistics Foundation website, with home and away statistics separated.

During the first five seasons of the league, that is, until the season 1893–94, re-election process concerned the clubs which finished in the bottom four of the league. From the 1894–95 season and until the 1920–21 season the re-election process was required of the clubs which finished in the bottom three of the league. From the 1922–23 season on it was required of the bottom two teams of both Third Division North and Third Division South. Since the Fourth Division was established in the 1958–59 season, the re-election process has concerned the bottom four clubs in that division.

First Division

Liverpool won the league title for a third successive season, although it was a much closer contest than the previous season. They also lifted a fourth consecutive League Cup and also their fourth European Cup in eight seasons to become the first English team to win three major trophies in the same season.

Their biggest rivals in the title race were Manchester United, who led the table at several stages of the season before dropping points in several crucial games later in the season to finish fourth. Southampton enjoyed their best league season to date with a second place finish, while Nottingham Forest finished third and also reached the semi-finals of the UEFA Cup. QPR, newly promoted, finished top of all the London clubs with a fifth place final position - which saw manager Terry Venables offered the job as manager of FC Barcelona, which he duly accepted. Tottenham Hotspur were unable to sustain a title challenge but lifted the UEFA Cup in Keith Burkinshaw's final season as manager.

Luton Town were surprise title contenders during the first half of the season before a dismal second half of the season saw them finish 16th.

Watford, the previous season's runners-up, began the season struggling near the foot of the table, before manager Graham Taylor brought Scottish striker Mo Johnston to the club as successor to Luther Blissett, and his new signing scored 20 goals as Watford climbed to a secure 11th place finish.

Everton were in the bottom half of the table and fans were calling for manager Howard Kendall to be sacked by November 1983, but the board stuck by their manager and gave the go-ahead for him to sign Wolves striker Andy Gray, who revived Everton's season as they climbed up to seventh place in the final table and ended their 14-year wait for a major trophy by beating Watford 2-0 in the final of the FA Cup. Gray was cup-tied for Everton's League Cup fixtures, but they still reached the final and took Liverpool to a replay before losing 1-0.

Just one season after winning promotion back to the First Division, Wolves went straight back down to the Second Division in bottom place. Notts County were next to go down, having survived for three seasons in the First Division. The final relegation place went to Birmingham City.

Final table

First Division results

Managerial changes

First Division maps

Second Division

Second Division results

Second Division maps

Third Division

Results

Third Division maps

Fourth Division

Results

Fourth Division maps

Election/Re-election to the Football League
As champions of the Alliance Premier League, Maidstone United (1897) won for the second time the right to apply for election to the Football League, to replace one of the four bottom teams in the 1983–84 Football League Fourth Division. The vote went as follows:

Hence, all four Football League teams were re-elected, and Maidstone United were again denied membership of the League.

See also
 1983–84 in English football

References

Ian Laschke: Rothmans Book of Football League Records 1888–89 to 1978–79. Macdonald and Jane’s, London & Sydney, 1980.

 
English Football League seasons